El Templete is a monument to the initial mass of San Cristóbal de la Habana celebrated on November 16, 1519.

Jean Baptiste Vermay painted the interior of the monument.

See also
La Alameda de Paula, Havana

References

Gallery

External links
Jean-Baptiste Vermay, El Templete interior
Restauración del Templete (Spanish)
Archive of Historic Havana

Buildings and structures in Havana
Tourist attractions in Havana